The World Repeats Itself Somehow (subtitled The Best of Eskimo Joe) is the first greatest hits album by Australian alternative rock band Eskimo Joe. The album was released on 10 December 2021.

Upon its announcement on 27 September 2021, frontman Kavyen Temperley said: "It's surreal listening back to what is now a twenty plus year career. From writing songs like 'Sweater' in a smelly old jam room, to songs like 'Say Something' which was written more recently after some time off, I'm incredibly proud of what we've created together musically, as well as the friendship we've managed to maintain with each other after so many years." The album features songs from five of the band's six albums.

Track listing

Charts

Release history

References

2021 greatest hits albums
Eskimo Joe albums
Compilation albums by Australian artists
Warner Records compilation albums